Kyaw Ye Aung (born 5 May 1966 in Bogale) is a two-time Myanmar Academy Award winning Burmese actor . He won his first Myanmar Academy Award for Best Actor in 1996 with "Thar thame zanee Kyinwar" and achieved his second award for Best Actor in 2007 with "Koe sal sa thar late mal".

Early life
Kyaw Ye Aung was born on Bogale, Ayeyawady Region, Myanmar. His parents are  U Myint Naing and Daw Khin Hla.

Personal life
Kyaw married Su Mon. They have two children, Hmone Nathar and Htoo Myat kyaw.

Filmography

Film
 Over 297 films

Awards and nominations

References

Living people
1996 births
Burmese male film actors
20th-century Burmese male actors
21st-century Burmese male actors